"All I Want for Christmas Is You" is a Christmas song recorded by American novelty act Vince Vance & the Valiants. Initially released as a single in 1989, Vince Vance's version of the song has charted several times on the Billboard country singles charts. It is one of two records to chart for Vince Vance & the Valiants, the other being "Bomb Iran."

Content
"All I Want for Christmas Is You" is a mid-tempo in compound duple meter, featuring lead vocals from Lisa Burgess Stewart, who now records under the name Lisa Layne. In it, the singer explains that she does not want Christmas decorations nor gifts from Santa Claus. Instead, all she wants for Christmas is her lover. The melody used in the song is based on Bobby Vinton's number 9 pop hit single from early 1964, "My Heart Belongs to Only You," with a few minor alterations.

Reception
In his review of the album All I Want for Christmas Is You, Allmusic reviewer Jason Birchmeier referred to the song as a "holiday favorite within the country community during the '90s" but noted that the rest of the album was not "remotely worth bothering with."

Having received frequent rotation on country radio and adult contemporary radio during the Christmas season since its 1993 re-release, "All I Want for Christmas Is You" is also the most-played country music Christmas song.

The song was also made into a music video directed by Steve Dunning.

Chart performance
The song first charted in early 1994 based on airplay from the 1993 Christmas season, peaking at #55 on the Billboard Hot Country Singles & Tracks (now Hot Country Songs) charts on the chart week of January 8, 1994. It re-entered in December 1994, reaching a new peak of #52 on the chart week of January 7, 1995. The song re-entered the country charts again every January afterward, each time peaking higher than the last; it did not appear in the 1998-99 holiday season but again charted for the final time in January 2000, reaching its peak on that chart of 31. Although it never charted on the country charts again, it peaked at #23 on the Hot 100 Recurrent Airplay chart in 2002 (despite having never entered or bubbled under the Billboard Hot 100 or Hot 100 Airplay charts), and has re-appeared on the Hot Country Recurrents chart every Christmas since late 2000-early 2001.

Lawsuit 
On June 3, 2022, Andy Stone, who portrayed Vince Vance, filed a copyright lawsuit against Mariah Carey, alleging that she "exploited" and made "undeserved profits" off his song with her "All I Want for Christmas Is You", which was published five years after his. On  November 2 of the same year, the lawsuit was dropped.

Kelly Clarkson version

In 2020, Kelly Clarkson released a version of the song as a standalone single. She also later included it on her 2021 album, When Christmas Comes Around...

Charts

Release history

References

1989 songs
American Christmas songs
Vince Vance & The Valiants songs
Song recordings produced by James Stroud
Kelly Clarkson songs